Alexander McDonald (23 April 1883 – 4 May 1967) was a New Zealand rugby union player. A loose forward, McDonald represented  at a provincial level, and was a member of the New Zealand national side, the All Blacks, between 1905 and 1913. He played 41 matches for the All Blacks including 14 as captain. McDonald played in eight internationals, including the famous "Match of the Century" against Wales. He went on to coach both the Otago and  provincial teams, and was a North Island, South Island and national selector. He co-managed the All Blacks on their 1938 tour of Australia, and was assistant manager for the 1949 South African tour.

McDonald died at Dunedin on 4 May 1967, and his ashes were buried in Andersons Bay Cemetery.

References

1883 births
1967 deaths
Rugby union players from Dunedin
New Zealand rugby union players
New Zealand international rugby union players
Otago rugby union players
Rugby union flankers
New Zealand rugby union coaches
Burials at Andersons Bay Cemetery